Shimizu Ice Stream is an ice stream in the Horlick Mountains, draining west-northwest from the area between Wisconsin Range and Long Hills to enter the south flank of Horlick Ice Stream. Mapped by United States Geological Survey (USGS) from surveys and U.S. Navy air photos, 1959–64. Named by Advisory Committee on Antarctic Names (US-ACAN) after Hiromu Shimizu, glaciologist, Byrd Station winter party, 1961,; later Associate Professor, Institute of Low Temperature Science, Hokkaido, Japan.

Ice streams of Marie Byrd Land